Piper cubeba, cubeb or tailed pepper is a plant in genus Piper, cultivated for its fruit and essential oil. It is mostly grown in Java and Sumatra, hence sometimes called Java pepper. The fruits are gathered before they are ripe, and carefully dried. Commercial cubeb consists of the dried berries, similar in appearance to black pepper, but with stalks attached – the "tails" in "tailed pepper".  The dried pericarp is wrinkled, and its color ranges from grayish brown to black. The seed is hard, white and oily. The odor of cubeb is described as agreeable and aromatic and the taste as pungent, acrid, slightly bitter and persistent.  It has been described as tasting like allspice, or like a cross between allspice and black pepper.

Cubeb came to Europe via India through the trade with the Arabs. The name cubeb comes from Arabic  by way of Old French quibibes. Cubeb is mentioned in alchemical writings by its Arabic name. In his Theatrum Botanicum, John Parkinson tells that the king of Portugal (Possibly either Philip IV of Spain or John IV of Portugal, as that year was marked by the start of the Portuguese Restoration War) prohibited the sale of cubeb to promote black pepper (Piper nigrum) around 1640. It experienced a brief resurgence in 19th-century Europe for medicinal uses, but has practically vanished from the European market since. It continues to be used as a flavoring agent for gins and cigarettes in the West, and as a seasoning for food in Indonesia.

History

In the fourth century BC, Theophrastus mentioned komakon, including it with cinnamon and cassia as an ingredient in aromatic confections. Guillaume Budé and Claudius Salmasius have identified komakon with cubeb, probably due to the resemblance which the word bears to the Javanese name of cubeb, kumukus. This is seen as a curious evidence of Greek trade with Java in a time earlier than that of Theophrastus. It is unlikely Greeks acquired them from somewhere else, since Javanese growers protected their monopoly of the trade by sterilizing the berries by scalding, ensuring that the vines were unable to be cultivated elsewhere.

In the Tang Dynasty, cubeb was brought to China from Srivijaya. In India, the spice came to be called kabab chini, that is, "Chinese cubeb", possibly because the Chinese had a hand in its trade, but more likely because it was an important item in the trade with China. In China this pepper was called both vilenga, and vidanga, the cognate Sanskrit word. Li Hsun thought it grew on the same tree as black pepper. Tang physicians administered it to restore appetite, cure "demon vapors", darken the hair, and perfume the body. However, there is no evidence showing that cubeb was used as a condiment in China.

The Book of One Thousand and One Nights, compiled in the 9th century, mentions cubeb as a remedy for infertility, showing it was already used by Arabs for medicinal purposes. Cubeb was introduced to Arabic cuisine around the 10th century. The Travels of Marco Polo, written in late 13th century, describes Java as a producer of cubeb, along with other valuable spices.

In the 14th century, cubeb was imported into Europe from the Grain Coast, under the name of pepper, by merchants of Rouen and Lippe. Cubeb eventually came to be thought of as repulsive to demons by the people of Europe. Ludovico Maria Sinistrari, a Catholic priest who wrote about methods of exorcism in the late 17th century, includes cubeb as an ingredient in an incense to ward off an incubus.

After the prohibition of its sale in Portugal in 1640, culinary use of cubeb decreased dramatically in Europe, and only its medicinal application continued to the 19th century. In the early 20th century, cubeb was regularly shipped from Indonesia to Europe and the United States. The trade gradually diminished to an average of  annually, and practically ceased after 1940.

Chemistry

The dried cubeb berries contain essential oil comprising monoterpenes (sabinene 50%, α-thujene, and carene) and sesquiterpenes (caryophyllene, copaene, α- and β-cubebene, δ-cadinene, germacrene), the oxides 1,4- and 1,8-cineole and the alcohol cubebol.

About 15% of a volatile oil is obtained by distilling cubeb with water. Cubebene, the liquid portion, has the formula C15H24 and comes in two forms, α- and β-.  They differ only in the position of the alkene moiety, with the double-bond being endocyclic (part of the five-membered ring) in α-cubebene, as shown, but exocyclic in β-cubebene. It is a pale green viscous liquid with a warm woody, slightly camphoraceous odor. After rectification with water, or on keeping, this deposits rhombic crystals of camphor of cubeb.

Cubebin (C20H20O6) is a crystalline substance existing in cubeb, discovered by Eugène Soubeiran and Hyacinthe Capitaine in 1839. It may be prepared from cubebene, or from the pulp left after the distillation of the oil. The drug, along with gum, fatty oils, and malates of magnesium and calcium, contains also about 1% of cubebic acid, and about 6% of a resin. The dose of the fruit is 30 to 60 grains, and the British Pharmacopoeia contains a tincture with a dose of 4 to 1 dram.

Uses

History in folk medicine 

Arab herbalists of the Middle Ages were usually versed in alchemy, and cubeb was used, under the name kababa, when preparing the water of al butm . The modern use of cubeb in England was in treating gonorrhea, where its antiseptic action was of much value. William Wyatt Squire wrote in 1908 that cubeb berries "act specifically on the genitourinary mucous membrane. (They are) given in all stages of gonorrhea" . The National Botanic Pharmacopoeia printed in 1921 stated that cubeb was "an excellent remedy for flour albus or whites" .

Culinary
In Europe, cubeb was one of the valuable spices during the Middle Ages. It was ground as a seasoning for meat or used in sauces. A medieval recipe includes cubeb in making sauce sarcenes, which consists of almond milk and several spices. As an aromatic confectionery, cubeb was often candied and eaten whole. Ocet Kubebowy, a vinegar infused with cubeb, cumin and garlic, was used for meat marinades in Poland during the 14th century . Cubeb can be used to enhance the flavor of savory soups.

Cubeb reached Africa by way of the Arabs. In Moroccan cuisine, cubeb is used in savory dishes and in pastries like makrouts, little diamonds of semolina with honey and dates. It also appears occasionally in the list of ingredients for the famed spice mixture Ras el hanout. In Indonesian cuisine, especially in Indonesian gulés (curries), cubeb is frequently used.

Cigarettes and spirits

Cubeb was frequently used in the form of cigarettes for asthma, chronic pharyngitis, and hay fever. Edgar Rice Burroughs, being fond of smoking cubeb cigarettes, humorously stated that if he had not smoked so many cubebs, there might never have been Tarzan. Marshall's Prepared Cubeb Cigarettes was a popular brand, with enough sales to still be made during World War II. 

In 2000, cubeb oil was included in the list of ingredients found in cigarettes, published by the Tobacco Prevention and Control Branch of North Carolina's Department of Health and Human Services.

Bombay Sapphire gin is flavored with botanicals including cubeb and grains of paradise. The brand was launched in 1987, but its maker claims that it is based on a secret recipe dating to 1761. Pertsivka, a dark brown Ukrainian pepper flavoured horilka with a burning taste, is prepared from infusion of cubeb and capsicum peppers.

Other

Cubeb is sometimes used to adulterate the essential oil of patchouli, which requires caution for patchouli users. In turn, cubeb is adulterated by Piper baccatum (also known as the "climbing pepper of Java") and Piper caninum.

See also
Domesticated plants and animals of Austronesia

References

Notes

Works cited 

 .
 .
 .
 .
 .
 .
 .
 .
 .
 .
 .
 .
 .
 .
 .
 .
 .
 .
 .
 .
 .
 .
 .
 .
 .
 .
Attribution
 

African cuisine
Arab cuisine
Edible nuts and seeds
Flora of the Lesser Sunda Islands
Indonesian cuisine
Medicinal plants of Asia
Medieval cuisine
Spices
cubeba